The Women's 800m freestyle event at the 2010 South American Games was held on March 27, with the slow heat at 10:14 and the fast heat at 18:00.

Medalists

Records

Results

Final

References
Final

Freestyle 800m W